Gene Tunney Patton (July 8, 1926 – June 25, 2009) was a Major League Baseball player. He played one game with the Boston Braves on June 17, 1944.

References

External links

Boston Braves players
Wilmington Blue Rocks (1940–1952) players
Hartford Chiefs players
Evansville Braves players
Raleigh Capitals players
Baseball players from Pennsylvania
1926 births
2009 deaths